The Battle of Wakefield took place in Sandal Magna near Wakefield in northern England, on 30 December 1460. It was a major battle of the Wars of the Roses. The opposing forces were an army led by nobles loyal to the captive King Henry VI of the House of Lancaster and his Queen Margaret of Anjou on one side, and the army of Richard, Duke of York, the rival claimant to the throne, on the other.

For several years before the battle, the Duke of York had become increasingly opposed to the weak King Henry's court. After open warfare broke out between the factions and Henry became his prisoner, he laid claim to the throne, but lacked sufficient support. Instead, in an agreement known as the Act of Accord, he was made Henry's heir to the throne, displacing from the succession Henry's and Margaret's 7-year-old son Edward, Prince of Wales. Margaret of Anjou and several prominent nobles were irreconcilably opposed to this accord, and massed their armies in the north. Richard of York marched north to deal with them, but found he was outnumbered.

Although he occupied Sandal Castle, York sortied from the castle on 30 December. His reasons for doing so have been variously ascribed to deception by the Lancastrian armies, or treachery by some nobles and Lancastrian officers who York thought were his allies, or simple rashness or miscalculation by York. He was killed and his army was destroyed. Many of the prominent Yorkist leaders and their family members died in the battle or were captured and executed.

Background
King Henry VI ascended the throne in 1422, when he was only nine months old. He grew up to be an ineffective king, and prone to spells of mental illness. There were increasingly bitter divisions among the officials and councillors who governed in Henry's name, mainly over the conduct of the Hundred Years' War with France. By the early 1450s, the most important rivalry was that between Richard, Duke of York, and Edmund Beaufort, Duke of Somerset. York argued for a more vigorous prosecution of the war, to recover territories recently lost to the French, while Somerset belonged to the party which tried to secure peace by making concessions. York had been Lieutenant in France for several years and resented being supplanted in that office by Somerset, who had then failed to defend Normandy against French armies.

York was not only the wealthiest magnate in the land, but was also descended through both his parents from King Edward III, leading to calls that he be recognised as successor to the childless King Henry. His rival, Somerset, belonged to the Beaufort family, who were distant cousins of King Henry. Originally illegitimate, the Beauforts had been made legitimate by an Act of Parliament but were supposedly barred from the line of succession to the throne. However, there was always the possibility that this could be circumvented and the Beaufort line eventually produced King Henry VII and the Tudor dynasty.

York was appointed Lieutenant of Ireland, effectively exiling him from court, while Somerset increased his influence over the king. In 1452, York marched on London in an attempt to force Henry to dismiss Somerset from the government, but at this stage he lacked support and was forced to swear not to take arms against the king at Old St Paul's Cathedral. Then in 1453, Henry VI suffered a complete mental breakdown. The Great Council of peers appointed York Lord Protector and he governed the country responsibly, but Henry recovered his sanity after eighteen months and restored Somerset to favour. During Henry's madness his queen, Margaret of Anjou, had given birth to a son, which dashed York's hopes of becoming king if Henry died.

Fearing arrest for treason, York and his most prominent allies, the Nevilles (York's brother in law, the Earl of Salisbury and his son, the Earl of Warwick, later known as the "Kingmaker"), finally resorted to armed force in 1455. At the First Battle of St Albans, many of York's and Salisbury's rivals and enemies were killed, including Somerset, the Earl of Northumberland (whose family, the Percys, had been involved in a long-running feud with the Nevilles) and Lord Clifford.

After the battle, York reaffirmed his loyalty to King Henry, who had been found abandoned in a shop in the town. He was reappointed Lord Protector and Lieutenant of Ireland. Margaret of Anjou nevertheless suspected York of wishing to supplant her infant son, Edward, as Henry's successor, and the heirs of the Lancastrian nobles who were killed at St Albans remained at deadly feud with York.

Events of the year preceding Wakefield
After an uneasy peace during which attempts at reconciliation failed, hostilities broke out again in 1459. Richard of York once again feared indictment for rebellion by a Great Council dominated by his opponents. He and the Nevilles concentrated their forces near York's stronghold at Ludlow Castle in the Welsh Marches but at the confrontation with the much larger royal army which became known as the Battle of Ludford, some of Warwick's contingent from the garrison of Calais, led by experienced captain Andrew Trollope, defected overnight. York and the Nevilles promptly abandoned their troops and fled. The next day, the outnumbered and leaderless Yorkist army surrendered.

York went to Ireland, where he had unchallenged support, while Salisbury, Warwick and York's eldest son Edward, Earl of March, made their way to Calais, where Warwick was Constable. They narrowly forestalled the new Duke of Somerset who, with Trollope, had been sent to regain it. Lancastrian attempts to reassert their authority over Ireland and Calais failed, but York and his supporters were declared traitors and attainted. The victorious Lancastrians became reviled for the manner in which their army had looted the town of Ludlow after the Yorkist surrender at Ludford Bridge, and the repressive acts of a compliant Parliament of Devils which caused many uncommitted peers to fear for their own property and titles. The country remained in disorder.

In 1460, the Nevilles invaded England through a foothold they had already established at Sandwich and rapidly secured London and the South of England where Warwick had popular support. They then advanced north to engage Henry's army in the Midlands. At the Battle of Northampton, part of the Lancastrian army defected and the rest were decisively defeated. Henry was captured on the battlefield for the second time. He was taken to London, and confined in the Bishop of London's palace. George Neville, Bishop of Exeter, was appointed Chancellor of England and Viscount Bourchier (another of York's brothers in law) was appointed Treasurer.

The Duke of York landed in Chester some weeks later and made his way to London with much pomp. Entering Parliament, he attempted to claim the throne, but was met with stunned silence. Even his close allies were not prepared to support such a drastic step. Instead, after the House of Lords had considered his claim, they passed the Act of Accord, by which Henry would remain king, but York would govern the country as Lord Protector. Henry's son was disinherited, and York or his heirs would become king on Henry's death. The powerless and frightened Henry was forced to assent.

Lancastrian moves
When the Battle of Northampton was fought, Queen Margaret and her seven-year-old son Edward had been at Eccleshall Castle near Stafford. After many adventures with brigands and outlaws, they fled via Cheshire to Harlech Castle in North Wales, where they joined Lancastrian nobles (including Henry's half-brother Jasper Tudor and the Duke of Exeter) who were recruiting armies in Wales and the West Country. They later proceeded by ship to Scotland, where Margaret gained troops and other aid for the Lancastrian cause from the queen and regent, Mary of Guelders, in return for the surrender of the town and castle of Berwick upon Tweed.

At the same time, other Lancastrians were rallying in Northern England. Many of them, including the Earl of Northumberland and Lords Clifford and Ros, had estates and influence in the north. They were later joined by the Duke of Somerset and the Earl of Devon, who brought their forces from the West Country. Northumberland, Clifford and Somerset were the sons of York's and Salisbury's rivals who had been killed at St. Albans. The Lancastrian forces mustered near Kingston upon Hull, and were said (in Gregory's Chronicle, a near-contemporary account) to number 15,000. A substantial part of these forces encamped at Pontefract began pillaging York's and Salisbury's estates nearby.

York's response
Faced with these challenges to his authority as Protector, York despatched his eldest son Edward to the Welsh Marches to contain the Lancastrians in Wales and left the Earl of Warwick in charge in London. He himself marched to the north of England on 9 December, accompanied by his second son Edmund, Earl of Rutland, and the Earl of Salisbury. He tried to bring a train of artillery under "one called Lovelace, a gentleman of Kent" but bad weather forced the artillery to return to London.

York's and Salisbury's army was said by some to number 8,000 to 9,000 men, but by others to be only a few hundred strong, as York intended to recruit local forces with a Commission of Array. He had probably underestimated both the numbers of the Lancastrian army in the north and the degree of opposition he had provoked by his attempt to seize the throne. On an earlier expedition to the north during his first protectorship in 1454, he and the Nevilles had easily subdued a rebellion by the Percys and the Duke of Exeter. In 1460, not only had almost every other northern peer joined the Lancastrian army, but York's nominal supporters were also divided. The Nevilles were one of the wealthiest and most influential families in the North and in addition to controlling large estates, the Earl of Salisbury had held the office of Warden of the Eastern March for several years. However, in the Neville–Neville feud, the cadet branch of the family headed by Salisbury had largely disinherited and eclipsed the senior branch (sometimes referred to as the "northern Nevilles") under his great-nephew, the Earl of Westmoreland. Westmoreland had spent several years trying to recover his lands. He had since become too ill, perhaps with some mental disorder, to play any active part. His younger brother, John Neville of Raby, had much to gain by York's and Salisbury's destruction.

The Lancastrians were still being reinforced. On 16 December, at the Battle of Worksop in Nottinghamshire, York's vanguard clashed with Somerset's contingent from the West Country moving north to join the Lancastrian army, and was defeated.

Battle

On 21 December, York reached his own fortress of Sandal Castle near Wakefield. He sent probes towards the Lancastrian camp at Pontefract  to the east, but these were repulsed. York sent for help to his son Edward, but before any reinforcements could arrive, he sortied from the castle on 30 December.

It is not known for certain why York did so. One theory was later recounted in Edward Hall's chronicle, written a few decades after the event, but partly from first-hand sources, and the contemporary Burgundian Jean de Waurin's chronicle. In a stratagem possibly devised by the veteran Andrew Trollope (who by Waurin's account had also sent messages to York via feigned deserters that he was prepared to change sides once again) half the Lancastrian army under Somerset and Clifford advanced openly towards Sandal Castle, over the open space known as "Wakefield Green" between the castle and the River Calder, while the remainder under Ros and the Earl of Wiltshire were concealed in the woods surrounding the area. York was probably short of provisions in the castle and, seeing that the enemy were apparently no stronger than his own army, seized the opportunity to engage them in the open rather than withstand a siege while waiting for reinforcements.

Other accounts suggested that, possibly in addition to Trollope's deception, York was fooled by some of John Neville of Raby's forces displaying false colours into thinking that reinforcements sent by Warwick had arrived. By another contemporary account, William Worcester's Annales Rerum Anglicorum, John Neville himself obtained a Commission of Array from Richard of York to raise 8,000 men to fight on York's side under the Earl of Westmoreland. Having gathered this force and enticed York to leave the castle to rendezvous with him, John Neville then defected to the Lancastrians.

Another suggestion was that York and Somerset had agreed a truce during Christmas until 6 January, the Feast of Epiphany, but the Lancastrians had no intention of honouring the truce. On three successive days, they sent heralds to provoke York into premature action with insulting messages and when York moved into the open the Lancastrians treacherously attacked earlier than had been agreed, catching York at a disadvantage while many of his men were absent foraging for supplies.

The simplest suggestion was that York acted rashly. For example, historian John Sadler states that there was no Lancastrian deception or ambush; York led his men from the castle on a foraging expedition (or by popular belief, to rescue some of his foragers who were under attack) and as successive Lancastrian contingents joined the battle (the last being Clifford's division, encamped south and east of Sandal Magna), York's army was outnumbered, surrounded and overwhelmed.

The Yorkists marched out of Sandal Castle down the present-day Manygates Lane towards the Lancastrians located to the north of the castle. It is generally accepted that, as York engaged the Lancastrians to his front, others attacked him from the flank and rear, cutting him off from the castle. In Edward Hall's words:

... but when he was in the plain ground between his castle and the town of Wakefield, he was environed on every side, like a fish in a net, or a deer in a buckstall; so that he manfully fighting was within half an hour slain and dead, and his whole army discomfited.

Casualties
One near-contemporary source (Gregory's Chronicle) claimed that 2,500 Yorkists and 200 Lancastrians were killed, but other sources give wildly differing figures, from 2,200 to only 700 Yorkists dead.

The Duke of York was either killed in the battle or captured and immediately executed. Some later works support the folklore that he suffered a crippling wound to the knee and was unhorsed, and he and his closest followers then fought to the death at that spot; others relate the account that he was taken prisoner (by one Sir James Luttrell of Devonshire), mocked by his captors and beheaded.

His son Edmund, Earl of Rutland, attempted to escape over Wakefield Bridge, but was overtaken and killed, possibly by Clifford in revenge for his father's death at St Albans. Salisbury's second son Sir Thomas Neville also died in the battle. Salisbury's son in law William, Lord Harington, and Harington's father, William Bonville, were captured and executed immediately after the battle. (The Bonvilles had been engaged in a feud with the Earl of Devon and the Courtenay family in Devon and Cornwall.) Salisbury himself escaped the battlefield but was captured during the night, and was taken to the Lancastrian camp. Although the Lancastrian nobles might have been prepared to allow Salisbury to ransom himself, he was dragged out of Pontefract Castle and beheaded by local commoners, to whom he had been a harsh overlord. The mob may have been led by the "Bastard of Exeter", an illegitimate son of the Duke of Exeter.

Among the "commoners" in York's army who were killed was John Harrowe, a prominent mercer of London, described as a "captain of the foot".

Aftermath

After the battle the heads of York, Rutland and Salisbury were displayed over Micklegate Bar, the south-western gate through the York city walls, the Duke wearing a paper crown and a sign saying "Let York overlook the town of York".

The death of Richard of York did not end the wars, or the House of York's claim to the throne. The northern Lancastrian army which had been victorious at Wakefield was reinforced by Scots and borderers eager for plunder, and marched south. They defeated Warwick's army at the Second Battle of St Albans and recaptured the feeble-minded King Henry, who had been abandoned on the battlefield for the third time, but were refused entry to London and failed to occupy the city. Warwick and Edward of March reoccupied London, and within a few weeks, Edward of March was proclaimed King Edward IV.

At the first Battle of St Albans, York had been content with the death of his rivals for power. At Wakefield and in every battle in the Wars of the Roses thereafter, the victors would eliminate not only any opposing leaders but also their family members and supporters, making the struggle more bitter and revenge driven.

A monument erected on the spot where the Duke of York is supposed to have perished is positioned slightly south of the more likely spot where an older monument once stood, but which was destroyed during the English Civil War. A cross in memory of York's son, Rutland, was erected at the Park Street end of Kirkgate in Wakefield. Archaeologist Rachel Askew suggests that the memorial cross to the Duke of York may be fictional as the late-16th- and early-17th-century antiquarian John Camden did not mention it in his description of the location.

In literature and folklore
Many people are familiar with William Shakespeare's melodramatic version of events in Henry VI, Part 3, notably the murder of Edmund of Rutland, although Edmund is depicted as a small child, and following his unnecessary slaughter by Clifford, Margaret torments his father, York, before murdering him also. In fact, Rutland, at seventeen, was more than old enough to be an active participant in the fighting. Margaret was almost certainly still in Scotland at the time.

The battle is said by some to be the source for the mnemonic for remembering the traditional colours of the rainbow, Richard Of York Gave Battle in Vain, and also the mocking nursery rhyme, "The Grand Old Duke of York", although this much more likely refers to the eighteenth-century Duke of York, son of George III.

"Dicky's Meadow", a well-known Northern expression, is commonly believed to refer to Sandals Meadow, where the battle of Wakefield took place and where Richard met his end. The common view held that Richard was ill-advised to fight here. The expression is usually used to warn against risky action, as in "If you do that you'll end up in Dicky's Meadow." However, the first known usage of that phrase did not appear until the 1860s, around 400 years after the battle took place.

Footnotes

Notes

Citations

References

External links
 
 
 
 wars-of-the-roses.com
 Sandal Castle
 A journey following the funeral route of Richard, Duke of York, killed 1460, reburied at Fotheringhay 1476 

1460 in England
Battles of the Wars of the Roses
History of Wakefield
Battles involving Yorkshire
Conflicts in 1460